Rue Jarry is a street on the Island of Montreal which stretches from Boulevard de l'Acadie in the west to Boulevard Ray-Lawson to the east. It is named for settler of St. Laurent, Quebec Bernard Bleignier dit Jarry.

The street is nearly entirely served by the bus route 193 Jarry. A metro station (Jarry Station) is located at the intersection with Berri Street.

The street is home to the Cité des Arts du Cirque, a circus training centre and headquarters for the Cirque du Soleil.

Little Italy
The street has a very Italian-Canadian feel to it once it enters the borough of St. Leonard.

See also 
 Jarry Park
 Route 193 Jarry

Streets in Montreal
Villeray–Saint-Michel–Parc-Extension
Saint-Leonard, Quebec